Pinebrook is an unincorporated community and census-designated place (CDP) in Grimes County, Texas, United States. It was first listed as a CDP prior to the 2020 census.

An extension of the Aggie Expressway (Texas State Highway 249) is slated to pass just south of the community. The highway leads southeast  to Interstate 45 at Aldine, north of Houston.

Education
It is within Navasota Independent School District, which operates Navasota High School.

References 

Populated places in Grimes County, Texas
Census-designated places in Grimes County, Texas
Census-designated places in Texas